Ashokrao Anandrao Deshmukh (born 26 January 1952) is an Indian former politician. He was elected to the Lok Sabha, lower house of the Parliament of India from Parbhani, Maharashtra as a member of the Shiv Sena.

References

External links
Official biographical sketch in Parliament of India website

India MPs 1989–1991
Shiv Sena politicians
Lok Sabha members from Maharashtra
India MPs 1991–1996
1952 births
Living people
Marathi politicians
People from Parbhani